Nagvadar is a village in Upleta Taluka of Rajkot District of Gujarat State in India.

The village has several schools and banks.

References

Villages in Rajkot district